

The López Residence is a historic house in Aguadilla, Puerto Rico. Built in 1914, this one-story, Neoclassical structure is architecturally significant as a typical urban residence for a well-to-do Puerto Rican family in the early 20th century, and as one of the most important remaining works by architect Manuel Gómez Tejera. Notable architectural elements of the house include its five slender, octagonal Corinthian columns, recessed ceiling panels on the balcony, ornate cast-iron balcony ornamentation, native ceramic tile floors, rooftop balcony, four louvered wooden doors with scrollwork frames facing the street, and filigreed interior arches supported by turned and octagonal columns. It faces the 1925 District Courthouse across Progreso Street, forming a historic Neoclassical set.

The house was listed on the U.S. National Register of Historic Places in 1985.

See also
National Register of Historic Places listings in Aguadilla, Puerto Rico

Notes

References

External links
Summary sheet from the Puerto Rico State Historic Preservation Office 
Photo from the Puerto Rico State Historic Preservation Office

Houses completed in 1914
Houses on the National Register of Historic Places in Puerto Rico
Neoclassical architecture in Puerto Rico
National Register of Historic Places in Aguadilla, Puerto Rico
1914 establishments in Puerto Rico